The Prism Flow Red Deer Curling Classic is an annual bonspiel, or curling tournament, that takes place at the Red Deer Curling Club in Red Deer, Alberta. The tournament is held in a triple-knockout format. The men's tournament started in 1992 as a skins tournament. The women's tournament started in 1999 as a separate event held a few weeks earlier and merged with the men's event in 2007. The event was held as a World Curling Tour event until 2019 and has been held nearly every year since 2007. Curlers from Alberta have dominated the event on both sides since its inception. The event counts toward the Canadian Team Ranking System, which hands out points based on performances at CTRS events and deals with qualification to the Canadian Olympic Curling Trials.

The 2018 edition of the event made headlines for the ejection of Team Jamie Koe for "unacceptable behaviour", which included arriving to compete while clearly intoxicated.

Event names

Men's
 1992: Wheaton Chev-Olds Skins Invitational
 1993: Scottsville Skins Game
 1994–1995: Scottsville Classic
 1996–2004: Terroco Classic
 2005–2006: Meyers Norris Penny Cash Spiel

Women's
 1999–2000: Parkland Savings Ladies Classic
 2001–2006: Community Savings Ladies Classic

Combined
2007–2019: Red Deer Curling Classic
2021: Vesta Energy Curling Classic
2022: Prism Flow Red Deer Curling Classic

Past champions
''Only skip's name is displayed.

Men

Women

References

External links
Home Page
Red Deer Curling Centre Home

Sports competitions in Red Deer, Alberta
Curling in Alberta